This page details Swindon Town Football Club records.

Player records

Appearances

 Youngest first-team player – Paul Rideout, 16 years 107 days (v. Hull City, 29 November 1980)

Most appearances
As of 1 February 2007. (Former players only, competitive matches only, includes appearances as substitute):

Goalscorers

 Most goals in a season – 48, Harry Morris (1926–27)
 Most League goals in a season – 47, Harry Morris, (1926–27)
 Most goals in a single match – 5
Harry Morris (v. Queens Park Rangers, Third Division South, 18 December 1926)
Harry Morris (v. Norwich City, Third Division South, 26 April 1930)
Keith East (v. Mansfield Town, Third Division, 20 November 1965)
 Most goals in the League – 216, Harry Morris

Top scorers
As of 18 November 2006 (competitive matches only):

Club records

Wins

Most League wins in a season – 32 in 46 matches, Fourth Division, 1985–86
Fewest League wins in a season –
0 in 16 matches, Western League, 1901–02
2 in 16 matches, Western League, 1900–01
2 in 30 matches, Southern League First Division, 1901–02

Defeats

Most League defeats in a season – 26 in 46 matches, First Division, 1999–2000
Fewest League defeats in a season –
2 in 8 matches, Western League, 1898–99
4 in 46 matches, Second Division, 1995–96

Goals

 Most League goals scored in a season – 100 in 42 matches, Third Division South, 1926–27
 Fewest League goals scored in a season –
7 in 6 matches, Western League, 1899–1900
17 in 30 matches, Southern League First Division, 1901–02
 Most League goals conceded in a season – 105 in 42 matches, Third Division South, 1932–33
 Fewest League goals conceded in a season –
7 in 6 matches, Western League, 1899–1900
31 in 38 matches, Southern League First Division, 1910–11

Points

 Most points in a League season (2 for a win) – 64 in 46 matches, Third Division, 1968–69
 Most points in a League season (3 for a win) – 102 in 46 matches, Fourth Division, 1985–86

Matches

Firsts
First match
 (Unofficial history) – v. Rovers F.C., Friendly, 29 November 1879 (lost 4–0)
 (Official history) – v. St. Mark's Young Men's Friendly Society, Friendly, 12 November 1881 (drew 2–2)
First FA Cup match (pre-qualifying) – v. Watford Rovers, First Round, 23 October 1886 (won 1–0)
First FA Cup match (proper) – v. Brighton and Hove Albion, First Round, 13 January 1906 (lost 3–0)
First League match – v. Reading, Southern League First Division, 22 September 1894 (lost 4–3)
First European match – v. A.S. Roma, Anglo-Italian League Cup, 27 August 1969 (lost 2–1)
First League Cup match  – v. Shrewsbury Town, 12 October 1960 (won 2–1)

Record wins
 Record League win – 9–1 (home v. Luton Town, Third Division South, 28 August 1920)
 Record FA Cup win – 10–1 (away v. Farnham United Breweries, 28 November 1925)

Record defeats
 Record League defeat – 0–8 (away v. Loughborough, Second Division, 12 December 1896)
 Record FA Cup defeat – 1–10 (away v. Manchester City, 25 January 1930)

Transfers
 Record transfer fee received – £4,000,000 from Q.P.R. for Ben Gladwin & Massimo Luongo, May 2015.
 Record transfer fee paid – £800,000 to West Ham for Joey Beauchamp, August 1994.

Attendance
 Highest attendance at a home match – 32,000 (v. Arsenal, FA Cup Third Round replay, 15 January 1972)

Gate Receipts
 Record gate receipts – £149,371 vs Bolton Wanderers, Football League Cup Semi Final First Leg, 12 February 1995.

References

Records and Statistics
Swindon Town
Swindon Town